Miss International 1983, the 23rd Miss International pageant, was held on 11 October 1983 at Festival Hall, Osaka and hosted by Masumi Okada. Gidget Sandoval of Costa Rica was crowned at the end of the event.

Results

Placements

Contestants

  - Michelle Marie Banting
  - Eveline Rille
  - Marina De Ruyck
  - Eliana Limpias Suárez
  - Geórgia Marinho Ventura
  - Starr Andreeff
  - Marta Liliana Ruiz Orduz
  - Gidget Sandoval Herrera
  - Inge Ravn Thomsen
  - Nicola Stanley
  - Niina Maarit Kesäniemi
  - Valérie Guenveur
  - Loana Katharina Radecki
  - Plousia "Sia" Farfaraki
  - Shannon Dilbeck
  - Brigitte Bergman
  - Ileana Maritza López Turcios
  - Eve Lee Yuet-Fu
  - Steinunn Johanna Bergmann
  - Sahila Vimal Chadha
  - Sandra Eglington
  - Sigal Fogel
  - Federica Silvia Tersch
  - Akemi Fujita
  - Chung Young-soon
  - Helen Ann Peters
  - Rosalba Chávez Carretero
  - Brenda Dennise Ngatai
  - Margarita Tenorio Benavente
  - Christine Zeiner
  - Flor Eden "Epang" Guano Pastrana
  - Cesaltina da Conceição Lopes da Silva
  - Alison Dunn
  - Patricia Ngow Pui Lee
  - Milagros Pérez Castro
  - Barbara Zehnder
  - Kasama Senawat
  - Guzin Yildiz
  - Kimberly Anne Bleier
  - Donnatella "Donna" Bottone Tirante
  - Lianne Patricia Gray

Notes

Did not compete
  - Patricia Marisconi
  - Suzan Salomonsson

References

External links
 Pageantopolis - Miss International 1983

1983
1983 in Japan
1983 beauty pageants
Beauty pageants in Japan